Charles Ralph Simpson III (born July 8, 1945) is a senior United States district judge of the United States District Court for the Western District of Kentucky.

Education and career

Born in Cleveland, Ohio, Simpson received a Bachelor of Arts degree from the University of Louisville in 1967 and a Juris Doctor from the University of Louisville School of Law in 1970. He was in private practice in Louisville, Kentucky from 1971 to 1986. He was a part-time staff counsel, Jefferson County Judge/Executive from 1978 to 1984, and also a Jefferson County alcoholic beverage control administrator from 1983 to 1984. He was the city clerk of the City of Rolling Fields from 1985 to 1986.

Federal judicial service

On June 6, 1986, Simpson was nominated by President Ronald Reagan to a seat on the United States District Court for the Western District of Kentucky vacated by Charles M. Allen. Simpson was confirmed by the United States Senate on August 1, 1986, and received his commission on August 4, 1986. He served as Chief Judge from 1994 to 2001. He assumed senior status on February 1, 2013.

References

Sources
 

1945 births
Living people
Judges of the United States District Court for the Western District of Kentucky
United States district court judges appointed by Ronald Reagan
20th-century American judges
Lawyers from Louisville, Kentucky
University of Louisville School of Law alumni